Still Screaming is the debut album by American hardcore punk band Scream, released in 1983 through Dischord Records.

Track listing
"Came Without Warning"
"Bedlam"
"Solidarity"
"Your Wars/Killer"
"Piece of Her Time"
"Human Behavior"
"Stand"
"Fight/American Justice"
"New Song"
"Laissez-Faire"
"Influenced"
"Hygiene"
"Cry Wolf"
"Total Mash"
"Who Knows? Who Cares?"
"Amerarockers"
"U. Suck A./We're Fed Up"
"Ultraviolence/Screamin
"Violent Youth"

Personnel
Scream
Peter Stahl – vocals
Franz Stahl – guitars
Skeeter Thompson – bass, vocals
Kent Stax – drums
Ian MacKaye – producer
Eddie Janney – producer
Don Zientara – producer
Jefferson Rogers – producer on "Ultraviolence/Screamin

1983 albums
Scream (band) albums